Events from the year 1864 in Canada.

Incumbents

Crown
 Monarch – Victoria

Federal government
Parliament — 8th

Governors
Governor General of the Province of Canada — Charles Monck, 4th Viscount Monck 
Colonial Governor of Newfoundland — Anthony Musgrave
Governor of New Brunswick — Arthur Charles Hamilton-Gordon
Governor of Nova Scotia — Charles Hastings Doyle then Richard Graves MacDonnell then Sir William Fenwick Williams
Governor of Prince Edward Island — George Dundas

Premiers
Joint Premiers of the Province of Canada –
John Alexander Macdonald, Canada West Premier
Étienne-Paschal Taché, Canada East Premier 
Premier of Newfoundland — Hugh Hoyles 
Premiers of New Brunswick — Samuel Leonard Tilley 
Premiers of Nova Scotia – Charles Tupper
Premier of Prince Edward Island – John Hamilton Gray

Events
June 29 – St-Hilaire train disaster : A train of newly arrived immigrants fails to stop at the open swing span near Beloeil, Canada East. The Grand Trunk Railway train runs into the Richelieu River, killing 99.
June 30 – Macdonald-Cartier "Great Coalition" government formed.
July 18 – US Civil War: North-South negotiations begin at Niagara Falls, New York
September 1 – September 9: Charlottetown Conference, noted as the first step towards Confederation
September 19 – Confederate agents use Canada as base for attempt to free Confederate prisoners of war on Johnson's Island in Lake Erie.
October 10 – October 27: Quebec Conference, identified 72 resolutions for the British North America Act, 1867
October 19 – St. Albans Raid.

Births

January 11 – Henry Marshall Tory, Canadian university founder (died 1947)
February 15 – Sir William Howard Hearst, politician and 7th Premier of Ontario (died 1941)
March 31 – J. J. Kelso, journalist and social activist (died 1935)
July 27 – Ernest Howard Armstrong, journalist, politician and Premier of Manitoba (died 1946)
October 3 – William Robson, politician (died 1941)
October 8 – Ozias Leduc, painter (died 1955)
November 9 – James Alexander Murray, politician and Premier of New Brunswick (died 1960)
November 24 – John Wesley Brien, physician and politician (died 1949)
December 14 – Henry Edgarton Allen, politician

Deaths
 February 20 – Rose Fortune, entrepreneur (born 1774)
 February 26 – Louis-Hippolyte Lafontaine, politician (born 1807)
 April 29 – Abraham Pineo Gesner, physician and surgeon, geologist, and inventor (born 1797)

Historical documents
Report from a Confederate agent in Canada (including failed breakout at Johnson's Island POW camp)

Brief account of Confederate agents' raid on St. Albans, Vermont

Consequences in the U.S.A. follow the freeing of the St. Albans raiders by a Canadian court

Canadian in the Union Army describes desperate Confederate assaults at Battle of Franklin, Tennessee 

Illustration: Battle of Franklin

Intelligence reports that Greek fire is being manufactured at Windsor, Ontario for burning Buffalo, Cleveland, Detroit and other U.S. cities

Halifax, Nova Scotia sends a message of support to President Lincoln

Speaker in Montreal argues the U.S.A. is not hostile toward Canada 

Excerpts from George Brown's letter describing the Charlottetown Conference

Good prospects for the port of Collingwood, Canada West

References

 
Years of the 19th century in Canada
Canada
1864 in North America